Michael "Drew" Renaud (born 1985) is an American film director, screenwriter, editor and producer. He has received awards from the San Diego Film Festival and LA Shorts Fest.

Biography

Early years–present
Renaud was born in California.
At the age of 15, Renaud went on to learn filmmaking at the Steele Canyon High School in Spring Valley, California. This proved to be influential in his movie-making career. At the age of 19, he decided to continue his professionalization in filmmaking at the Brooks Institute, graduating in 2008, at the age of 22. In January 2008 Renaud signed a contract with the production company The Vault, being, among Brian Thompson and The Facrell Brothers one of the four directors signed with The Vault.

Film career
Renaud wrote almost all of his projects, including the music video for Pensive – Live Fast.
He directed a total of 8 short films (one documentary and two music video) in a period of 5 years – Housekeeping, Lunchbreak, Dirty Boots, Disconnected, Divide The Day and Live Fast (music videos),  and Street Angels (documentary).

Disconnected screened at the LA Shorts Fest and Street Angels at the San Diego Film Festival and LA Shorts Fest.

His latest project, Coach Shane is in post-production and is set to be released this year.

Filmography

Short films
 Housekeeping (2003)
 Lunchbreak (2004)
 Dirty Boots (2007)
 Disconnected (2007)
 Coach Shane (soon)

Music Videos
 Pensive – Live Fast (2005)
 Divide The Day (2006)

Documentaries
 Street Angels (2007)

Writer
 Lunchbreak (2004)
 Divide The Day (2006)
 Dirty Boots (2007)
 Street Angels (2007) (with Ryan Kohler)
 Coach Shane (coming soon)

Producer
 Street Angels (2007)

References

 Raddrew Productions
 Brooks
 San Diego Film Festival
 LA Shorts Fest

External links
 

1986 births
American male screenwriters
Living people
People from Ventura, California
Film directors from California
Screenwriters from California